Marcus Aurelius Probus (230–235 – September 282) was Roman emperor from 276 to 282. Probus was an active and successful general as well as a conscientious administrator, and in his reign of six years he secured prosperity for the inner provinces while withstanding repeated invasions of barbarian tribes on almost every sector of the frontier.

After repelling the foreign enemies of the empire Probus was forced to handle several internal revolts, but demonstrated leniency and moderation to the vanquished wherever possible. In his reign the constitutional authority of the Roman Senate was fastidiously maintained, and the victorious Emperor, who had carried his army to victory over the Rhine, professed himself dependent on the sanction of the Senate.

Upon defeating the Germans, Probus re-erected the ancient fortifications of emperor Hadrian between the Rhine and Danube rivers, protecting the Agri Decumates, and exacted from the vanquished a tribute of manpower to resettle depopulated provinces within the empire and provide for adequate defense of the frontiers. Despite his widespread popularity, Probus was killed in a mutiny of the soldiers while in the middle of preparations for the Persian war, which would be carried out under his successor Carus.

Early life
Probus was born between 230 and 235 (exact date of birth unknown) in Sirmium (modern day Sremska Mitrovica), Pannonia Inferior, the son of Dalmatius. According to the Alexandrian Chronicle, he was born sometime in the year 232. The unreliable Historia Augusta gives his father's name as Maximus and claims that his mother was of higher status than his father, that he had a sister named Claudia, that he was related to emperor Claudius Gothicus, his personal wealth was modest and his nearest kin unimportant. Besides his best known nomina Aurelius which can be found on most inscriptions, papyri and coinage, as well as Equitius attested on his coins from Ticinum and Pseudo-Aurelius Victor, the Historia Augusta gives him Valerius and Malalas Aelius.

Military career
Probus entered the army around 25 upon reaching adulthood. He rose rapidly through the ranks, repeatedly earning high military decorations. Appointed at a very young age as a military tribune by the emperor Valerian, in recognition of his latent ability,  he justified the choice by a distinguished victory over the Sarmatians on the Illyrian frontier. During the chaotic years of the reign of Valerian, Illyria was the only province, generaled by such officers as Claudius, Aurelian and Probus, where the barbarians were kept at bay, while Gaul was overrun by the Franks, Rhaetia by the Alemans, Thrace and the Mediterranean by the Goths, and the east by Shapur I. Probus became amongst the highest placed lieutenants of Aurelian, reconquering Egypt from Zenobia in 273 A.D. Emperor Tacitus, upon his accession in 275, appointed Probus supreme chief of the east, granting him extraordinary powers in order to secure a dangerous frontier. Though the details are not specified, he is said to have fought with success on almost every frontier of the empire, before his election as emperor by the troops upon Tacitus' death in 276, in his camp in Asia Minor.

As emperor 

Florian, the half-brother of Tacitus, also proclaimed himself emperor, and took control of Tacitus' army in Asia Minor, but was killed by his own soldiers after an indecisive campaign against Probus in the mountains of Cilicia. In contrast to Florian, who ignored the wishes of the Senate, Probus referred his claim to Rome in a respectful dispatch. The Senate enthusiastically ratified his pretensions. Probus  next travelled west, defeating the Goths along the lower Danube in 277, and acquiring the title of Gothicus. 
However, the Goths came to respect his ability and implored a treaty with the empire.

In 278, Probus campaigned successfully in Gaul against the Alemanni and Longiones; both tribes had advanced through the Neckar valley and across the Rhine into Roman territory. Meanwhile, his generals defeated the Franks and these operations were directed to clearing Gaul of Germanic invaders (Franks and Burgundians), allowing Probus to adopt the titles of Gothicus Maximus and Germanicus Maximus. Reportedly, 400,000 barbarians were killed during Probus' campaign, and the entire nation of the Lugii were extirpated.

After the defeat of the Germanic invaders in Gaul, Probus crossed the Rhine to campaign successfully against the barbarians in their homeland, forcing them to pay homage. In the aftermath of the campaign, Probus repaired the ancient fortifications erected by Hadrian in the vulnerable space between the Rhine and Danube, in the territory of Swabia. More significantly, Probus, by forcing from the vanquished tribes a tribute of manpower, established the precedent of settling barbarians within the empire as auxiliaries on a large scale. The provinces were depopulated by war, disease and the chaotic administration, heavy taxation, and extensive army recruitment, during the Crisis of the Third Century, and the barbarian colonies, at least in the short term, helped to restore frontier defense and the practice of agriculture.

The army discipline which Aurelian had repaired was cultivated and extended under Probus, who was however more shy in the practice of cruelty. One of his principles was never to allow the soldiers to be idle, and to employ them in time of peace on useful works, such as the planting of vineyards in Gaul, Pannonia and other districts, in order to restart the economy in these devastated lands.

In 279–280, Probus was, according to Zosimus, in Raetia, Illyricum and Lycia, where he fought the Vandals. In the same years, Probus' generals defeated the Blemmyes in Egypt. Either then, or during his previous command in Egypt, he ordered the reconstruction of bridges and canals along the Nile, where the production of grain for the Empire was centered.

In 280–281, Probus put down three usurpers, Julius Saturninus, Proculus and Bonosus. The extent of these revolts is not clear, but there are clues that they were not just local problems (an inscription with the name of Probus erased has been found as far as Spain). Following this, Probus then put down a revolt by an unnamed rebel in Britain with the assistance of a certain Victorinus, who was later made consul in 282. During the winter of 281, the emperor was in Rome, where he celebrated a triumph.

Probus was eager to start his eastern campaign, delayed by the revolts in the west. He left Rome in 282, travelling first towards Sirmium, his birth city.

Assassination 
Different accounts of Probus's death exist. According to Joannes Zonaras, the commander of the Praetorian Guard Marcus Aurelius Carus had been proclaimed, more or less unwillingly, emperor by his troops.

Probus sent some troops against the new usurper, but when those troops changed sides and supported Carus, Probus' remaining soldiers assassinated him at Sirmium (September/October 282). According to other sources, however, Probus was killed by disgruntled soldiers, who rebelled against his orders to be employed for civic purposes, like draining marshes. Allegedly, the soldiers were provoked when they overheard him lamenting the necessity of a standing army. Carus was proclaimed emperor after Probus' death and avenged the murder of his predecessor.

Legacy 
According to the favorable treatment of Gibbon (whose account is largely derived from the Augustan History), Probus was the last of the benevolent constitutional emperors of Rome. While his successor Carus (Imp. 282–284) simply disdained to seek the Senate's confirmation of his title, the latter's successor Diocletian (Imp. 284–305) took active measures to undermine its authority, and established the autocratic nature and divine derivation of the Imperial power. Never again, after Diocletian's reforms, would the Roman Senate play an active role in the management of the empire. On the military sphere,  Probus' victories continued the succession of martial Illyrian emperors begun by Claudius Gothicus, which restored the military supremacy of Rome after defeats sustained during the Crisis of the Third Century.

Family tree

References

Sources

Ancient sources
 Aurelius Victor, Epitome de Caesaribus
 Eutropius, Breviarium ab urbe condita
 Historia Augusta, Life of Probus
 Joannes Zonaras, Compendium of History extract: Zonaras: Alexander Severus to Diocletian: 222–284
 Zosimus, Historia Nova

Modern sources
 Mc Mahon, Robin, "Probus (276–282 A.D.) and Rival Claimants (Proculus, Bonosus, and Saturninus) of the 280s", DIR
 Dennis, Anthony J., "Antoniniani of the Roman Emperor Probus", Vol. 9, No. 11 The Celator November, 1995.
 
 
 
 
 
 Gibbon, Edward (1888) History of the Decline and Fall of the Roman Empire
 
Attribution:

External links

 
 Probus, article at NumisWiki

 
232 births
282 deaths
3rd-century murdered monarchs
3rd-century Roman emperors
Probus, Marcus
Deified Roman emperors
Gothicus Maximus
Imperial Roman consuls
Roman emperors murdered by the Praetorian Guard
People from Sirmium
Roman pharaohs
Illyrian emperors